The year 1712 in music involved some significant events.

Events
March 18 – Georg Philipp Telemann arrives in Frankfurt to take up his new post as city director of music and Kapellmeister at the Barfüsserkirche.
March 25 – Approximate date of the première of Johann Sebastian Bach's St Mark Passion pastiche at the chapel of Wilhelmsburg Castle (two movements by Bach).
September – George Frideric Handel re-locates to London, with the permission of his patron, the future King George I of Great Britain.
Johann Georg Pisendel joins the court orchestra at Dresden.

Classical music 
Tomaso Albinoni – 12 Trattenimenti armonici, Op. 6
Johann Sebastian Bach 
Prelude and Fugue in G major, BWV 541
Toccata, Adagio and Fugue in C major, BWV 564
Fantasia in G major, BWV 572
Toccata in F-sharp minor, BWV 910
Fugue in B minor, BWV 951
Fughetta in C minor, BWV 961
Suite in E minor for lute, BWV 996
Francesco Antonio Bonporti – 10 Inventions, Op. 10
Pieter Bustijn – 9 Suittes pour le clavessin 
Henry Carey – Setting of "The Lord My Pasture Shall Prepare" (hymn) by Joseph Addison
Arcangelo Corelli – Twelve Concerti Grossi, Op. 6 (composed)
Evaristo Felice Dall'Abaco 
Concerti a quattro da chiesa, Op. 2
12 Trio Sonatas, Op. 3
Christoph Graupner
Jesus ist und bleibt mein Leben, GWV 1107/12
Mein Gott, warum hast du mich verlassen?, GWV 1118/12a
Wenn wir in höchsten Nöten sein, GWV 1143/12
Demütiget euch nun, GWV 1144/12
Zähle meine Flucht, GWV 1154/12b
Wer da glaubet dass Jesus sei der Christ, GWV 1171/12
 George Frideric Handel – O Sing unto the Lord a New Song, HWV 249a
Jacques-Martin Hotteterre 
Sonates en trio pour les flûtes traversières et a bec, violon, hautbois, Op. 3
Suite in B minor, Op. 4
Reinhard Keiser – Brockes-Passion (Text by Barthold Heinrich Brockes)
Ferdinando Antonio Lazzari – Concerto in D major
John Loeillet – Lessons for the Harpsichord or Spinet
Benedetto Marcello – 12 Recorder Sonatas, Op. 2
Jean-Baptiste Morin – Cantates françoises à une et trois voix, Op. 6
James Paisible – The Gloucester. Mr. Isaac's new dance, made for Her Majesty's Birth Day...
Anne Danican Philidor – Premier livre de pièces
Giovanni Antonion Piani – 12 Violin Sonatas, Op. 1
Charles Piroye – Pièces d'orgue
Jean-Féry Rebel – Boutade
Georg Philipp Telemann  
Das ist meine Freude, TWV 8:17
Ouverture-Suite, TWV 55:A5 (approx.)
Francesco Maria Veracini – Il trionfo della innocenza patrocinata da S. NiccoI (oratorio)
Antonio Vivaldi – Violin Concerto in D major, RV 212
Johann Gottfried Walther – Meinen Jesum laß ich nicht
Jan Dismas Zelenka – Attendite et videte, ZWV 59

Opera
André Campra – Idomenée
André Cardinal Destouches – Callirhoé
George Frideric Handel 
Il Pastor Fido
Teseo, HWV 9 (composed)
 John Hughes (1677–1720) and Johann Ernst Galliard (d. 1747) – Calypso and Telemachus (opera)
Antonio Lotti – Porsenna

Births 
January
David Owen, harpist (died 1741)
Cecilia Young, soprano, wife of Thomas Arne (died 1789)
January 17 – John Stanley, composer and organist (died 1786)
January 24 – Frederick II of Prussia, enthusiastic amateur musician and composer (died 1786)
January 26 – Giacomo Puccini, Italian composer and head of a musical dynasty (died 1781) 
June 28 – Jean-Jacques Rousseau, polymath (died 1778)
July – John Hebden, musician and composer (died 1765)
date unknown
Marimutthu Pillai, Carnatic music composer (died 1787)
John Christopher Smith, composer (died 1795)
Sophia Schröder, vocalist at the Kungliga Hovkapellet (died 1750)
probable – Kane O'Hara, playwright and musician (died 1782)

Deaths 
April – Lambert Chaumont, organist and composer (born c.1630)
April 29 – Juan Bautista Jose Cabanilles, composer
August 7 – Friedrich Wilhelm Zachau, organist at Halle (born 1663)
August 26 – Sebastian Anton Scherer, composer (born 1631)
September 30 – Johann Michael Zächer, composer (born 1649)
November 6 – Johann Bernhard Staudt, composer (born 1654)
date unknown
Buhurizade Mustafa Itri, composer and performer of Turkish classical music (born c.1640) 
Juan de Araujo, Spanish composer active in South and Central America (born 1646)
Carlo Alessandro Guidi, poet and songwriter (born 1650)
probable – Carlo Ambrogio Lonati, violinist, composer and singer

References

 
18th century in music
Music by year